Alamlu may refer to:
 Alamlu Shah Ali
 Alamlu Tabriz